The genus Sturnella are North American grassland birds called meadowlarks. The genus was previously lumped with the South American meadowlarks now placed in the genus Leistes.

It includes two or three species of largely insectivorous grassland birds. In all species the male at least has a black or brown back and extensively yellow underparts.

Taxonomy and list of species
The genus Sturnella was introduced in 1816 by the French ornithologist Louis Jean Pierre Vieillot with the eastern meadowlark (Sturnella magna) as the type species. The name Sturnella is a diminutive of the Latin sturnus meaning "starling".

By the early 20th century, the meadowlarks were split. Only the "yellow-breasted" meadowlarks (eastern and western meadowlarks, including Lilian's) remained in the genus Sturnella. The red-breasted and white-browed meadowlarks were moved to the genus Leistes, while the pampas meadowlark, Peruvian meadowlark and long-tailed meadowlark made up the genus Pezites, which was established by Cabanis in 1851. By the late 20th century, all meadowlarks were lumped in the genus Sturnella. In 2017, all the red-breasted meadowlarks were merged into the genus Leistes.

The genus contains three species:
 Eastern meadowlark, Sturnella magna
 Chihuahuan meadowlark, Sturnella lilianae
 Western meadowlark, Sturnella neglecta

References

Further reading

 New World Blackbirds by Jaramillo and Burke,

External links
Sturnella videos, photos and sounds on the Internet Bird Collection

 
Bird genera
Taxa named by Louis Jean Pierre Vieillot